Blaine A. Stoughton (born March 13, 1953) is a Canadian former professional ice hockey forward who played twelve professional seasons. Stoughton played nine seasons in the National Hockey League (NHL) for the Pittsburgh Penguins, Toronto Maple Leafs, Hartford Whalers and New York Rangers, which bookended three seasons in the World Hockey Association (WHA) split among the Cincinnati Stingers, Indianapolis Racers and New England Whalers.

Playing career
Stoughton played his major junior career with the Flin Flon Bombers, and was drafted seventh overall by the Penguins in the 1973 NHL Amateur Draft. Stoughton had an up-and-down stint in the WHA. Often teamed with Rick Dudley and Rich LeDuc on the "LSD" line, Stoughton scored 52 goals for the Cincinnati Stingers in 1976–77. The next year, however, the free-wheeling Stoughton chafed under the restrictive defensive style of new coach Jacques Demers, fell into a slump and was traded to the Indianapolis Racers by mid-season. When the Racers folded in 1978, he was signed by the New England Whalers, where he played on the third line with Mike Rogers, scoring 19 goals. Stoughton scored at least 50 goals in a season in the NHL twice, at least 40 goals four times, and tied for the league lead with 56 in 1979-80, which is still a franchise record. Stoughton is the former head coach of the University of Cincinnati club hockey team.

Awards and achievements
Turnbull Cup (MJHL championship) (1969)
WCHL First All-Star Team (1972)
WCHL goal scoring leader (1972)
NHL goal scoring leader (1980)
Played in the 1982 NHL All-Star Game
Member of the Manitoba Hockey Hall of Fame

Career statistics

See also
List of NHL players with 100-point seasons

References

External links

Profile at hockeydraftcentral.com

1953 births
Canadian ice hockey right wingers
Cincinnati Stingers players
Dauphin Kings players
Flin Flon Bombers players
Hartford Whalers players
Asiago Hockey 1935 players
Hershey Bears players
Ice hockey people from Manitoba
Indianapolis Racers players
Living people
National Hockey League first-round draft picks
New England Whalers players
New Haven Nighthawks players
New York Rangers players
Oklahoma City Blazers (1965–1977) players
People from Parkland Region, Manitoba
Pittsburgh Penguins draft picks
Pittsburgh Penguins players
Quebec Nordiques (WHA) draft picks
Toronto Maple Leafs players
Canadian expatriate ice hockey players in Italy
Canadian expatriate ice hockey players in the United States